Mock Tudor is the tenth studio album by Richard Thompson. Released in 1999, it was his final album released by Capitol Records and his last to date for a major record label. Subsequent Thompson studio albums would be self-financed and distributed by smaller independent labels.

For this, his fifth album for Capitol, Thompson teamed up with producers Tom Rothrock and Rob Schnapf, and Mock Tudor had a more straightforward production than his preceding albums on Capitol which had been produced by Mitchell Froom. In this album Thompson draws predominantly on the musical styles of 1960s England—the time and place of his youth. The lyrics have a nostalgic tinge and are rich with allusion to fairy tales and children's books as well as to Shakespeare and T. S. Eliot.

Thematically, Mock Tudor is split into three sections:  Metroland—comprising the first five songs, "Cooksferry Queen" to "Hard on Me", Heroes In The Suburbs—covering "Crawl Back (Under My Stone)" through "Walking the Long Miles Home", and concluding with Street Cries And Stage Whispers—encompassing the last three songs (on the original release).

Although widely regarded by critics and Thompson fans as one of his best works, Mock Tudor did not enjoy much popularity among the public.

Track listing
All songs written by Richard Thompson.

"Cooksferry Queen" – 4:14
"Sibella" – 4:15
"Bathsheba Smiles" – 3:54
"Two-Faced Love" – 4:03
"Hard on Me" – 5:55
"Crawl Back (Under My Stone)" – 3:59
"Uninhabited Man" – 4:52
"Dry My Tears and Move On" – 3:48
"Walking the Long Miles Home" – 4:10
"Sights and Sounds of London Town" – 4:54
"That's All, Amen, Close the Door" – 5:56
"Hope You Like the New Me" – 5:00

Mock Tudor was released on Bong Load Records as a double vinyl LP and with two extra songs.

"Fully Qualified to Be Your Man"
"Mr. Rebound"

Personnel
Richard Thompson - guitar, vocals, mandolin, harmonium, hurdy-gurdy, dulcimer
Mitchell Froom - keyboards
Atom Ellis - bass guitar
Dave Mattacks - drums, percussion
Judith Owen - backing vocals on "Uninhabited Man" & "Two-Faced Love"
Danny Thompson - double bass
Teddy Thompson - guitar and backing vocals
David McKelsy - harmonica
Jeff Turmes - baritone saxophone
Charles Davis – cornet
Leslie Benedict – trombone
Randall Aldcroft – trombone
Larry Hall - cornet
Joey Waronker - extra drums on "Bathsheba Smiles"
Alicia Previn aka Lovely Previn - violin on "Mr. Rebound"
John Bergamot - percussion on "Mr. Rebound"
Technical
Tom Rothrock, Rob Schnapf – producers, recordists, mixers
Dan Thompson – recordist
Don Tyler – mastering

See also
Tudor Revival architecture, often called "Mock Tudor"

References 

Richard Thompson - The Biography by Patrick Humprhies. Schirmer Books. 0-02-864752-1
The Great Valerio by Dave Smith
http://www.richardthompson-music.com/
http://www.dmattacks.co.uk/tech3.htm

1999 albums
Richard Thompson (musician) albums
Albums produced by Tom Rothrock
Albums produced by Rob Schnapf
Capitol Records albums